William Arley Smith (January 3, 1912 – June 20, 1999) was a professional American football player.  He played college football at the University of Washington and was selected by the All-America Board, Liberty magazine, and the North American Newspaper Alliance as a first-team end on the 1933 College Football All-America Team.  He also played professional football at the end position for six seasons in the National Football League (NFL) with the Chicago Cardinals. He was born in Seattle.

References

1912 births
1999 deaths
American football ends
Chicago Cardinals players
Washington Huskies football players
Players of American football from Seattle